Ellen Frank (1904–1999) was a German film and television actress.

Selected filmography
 The Racokzi March (1933)
 Such a Rascal (1934)
 Peer Gynt (1934)
 A Night of Change (1935)
 The Girl from the Marsh Croft (1935)
 The Blonde Carmen (1935)
 The Old and the Young King (1935)
 Family Parade (1936)
 Under Blazing Heavens (1936)
 Gold in New Frisco (1939)
 Little Red Riding Hood (1954)
 Hansel and Gretel (1954)
 The Angel with the Flaming Sword (1954)
 The Royal Waltz (1955)
 Lina Braake (1975)

References

Bibliography
 Goble, Alan. The Complete Index to Literary Sources in Film. Walter de Gruyter, 1999.

External links

1904 births
1999 deaths
German film actresses
German television actresses